Jingan may refer to:

Jing'an County (靖安县), in Jiangxi, People's Republic of China
Jing'an District (静安区), in Shanghai, PRC
Jing'an Temple (静安寺), in Shanghai, PRC
Jingan Station (景安站), station of the Taipei Metro, in New Taipei, Taiwan
Jing'an, Changli County (靖安镇), town in Changli County, Hebei, PRC
Jingan Young (楊靜安), an award-winning writer from Hong Kong